Enemy Front is a World War II-themed first-person shooter video game developed and published by CI Games for Microsoft Windows, PlayStation 3 and Xbox 360. The game was first announced in 2011 and was released on June 10, 2014.

Gameplay
Robert Hawkins is an American war correspondent who is caught up with various Resistance groups across Europe during the Second World War. Along the way he finds help in the form of a Norwegian Commando, a German SOE agent and a femme fatale French Resistance fighter, also his Polish allies. The game is played through his flashbacks and will include real historical events, some of it highlighting Nazi atrocities committed in Europe. It also visits theatres of war, such as Poland and Norway, which have remained largely untouched by mainstream western media and especially other World War II first-person shooters. The game has a large amount of focus put on the Warsaw Uprising, with almost half of the levels featuring it.

Text from the official website describes the game:

Multiplayer
The game features three modes – Deathmatch, Team Deathmatch and Radio Transmission.

Development
The game was developed by Polish studio CI Games. It has had a long development cycle, first being announced in 2011. The game was originally set to be released in late 2012, but then delayed to early 2013. It moved to late 2013, then to spring 2014, before being released on June 10 in the USA. From its inception, Enemy Front has had many features added and cut, the most notable cuts being a large level based on the evacuation at Dunkirk, the removal of a customisable health system which allowed the player to choose between regenerating health or medical packs distributed around levels and the removal of the Lanchester submachine gun featured in several trailers and other promotional material, being touted as one of the game's "signature weapons". Stewart Black was the original producer of the game, but has since left. The executive producer is now Steve Hart.

Reception

Enemy Front received mixed to negative reviews from critics, with a score of 5/10 on GameSpot and 4.7/10 on IGN, both criticizing the poor AI and stealth, but praising the graphics, multiplayer and sniper sections. Eurogamer gave Enemy Front a 2/10, saying there were simply too many flaws to overlook.

References

2014 video games
CryEngine games
Bandai Namco games
Multiplayer and single-player video games
PlayStation 3 games
Video games developed in Poland
Video games set in France
Video games set in Germany
Video games set in Norway
Video games set in Poland
Video games scored by Cris Velasco
Video games using PhysX
Windows games
World War II first-person shooters
Xbox 360 games
Video games set in the 1940s
CI Games games